The Second Battle of Mohács, also known as the Battle of Harsány Mountain, was fought on 12 August 1687 between the forces of Ottoman Sultan Mehmed IV, commanded by the Grand-Vizier Sari Süleyman Paşa, and the forces of Holy Roman Emperor Leopold I, commanded by Charles of Lorraine. The result was a decisive victory for the Austrians.

Background
The Great Turkish War began in July 1683 with an attack on Vienna by the Ottoman army. The siege was broken by the Battle of Vienna on 12 September, won by the combined forces of the Holy Roman Empire of the German Nations and the Polish–Lithuanian Commonwealth, under the overall command of the King of Poland, John III Sobieski, who led the Polish forces. From September the initiative passed to the Imperial troops. In the following years the Imperial Habsburg armies under Charles of Lorraine drove the Ottomans back, conquering many fortresses (such as Esztergom, Vác, Pest). After the Battle of Buda they laid siege to and took over the former Hungarian capital of Buda. At the end of 1686 the Ottomans made peace overtures; however, the Imperial Habsburgs saw a chance to conquer the whole of Hungary and the overtures were rejected.

In April 1687 it was decided in Vienna that further military action should be taken. The main army (of about 40,000 troops) under the command of Duke Charles of Lorraine proceeded along the River Danube to Osijek on the River Drava, while another army of about 20,000 men under the command of Elector Max Emanuel of Bavaria moved along the River Tisza to Szolnok and towards Petrovaradin. In the middle of July the two imperial armies met on the Danube and either marched overland or along the Drava to Osijek.

In contrast, the Ottoman army (of about 60,000 men), under the command of the Grand Vizier Sari Süleyman Paşa, stayed in front of the main River Drava crossing (with its 8 km-long wooden bridge) at Osijek in order to protect it, and then fortified this position. When the Imperial Habsburg army arrived, the River Drava divided the two sides. At the end of July the Imperial Habsburg army was able to make a bridgehead on the shores of the river and stood in battle array, to challenge the Ottomans. However, the Ottoman army remained passive and was satisfied with artillery bombardments of the weirs on the Drava, the bridges and the riverside.

As the Duke of Lorraine realized he was not able to attack the fortified Ottoman camp, he decided to leave the bridgehead after a few days. For this he was criticized both by his own sub-commanders and by the Emperor Leopold I. The move was interpreted by the Ottoman Grand Vizier as a sign of a loss of morale by the Habsburg troops, so he decided to follow them. In early August, the Osman army drove the Habsburg army back toward Mohács and an Ottoman fortified position. The Ottomans had also built a fortified position at Darda, hidden among the thick bushes so that it was not visible to the Habsburg army. For this reason Duke Charles of Lorraine did not suspect the presence of the Ottoman army in the vicinity.

Battle

On the morning of 12 August the Duke of Lorraine decided to move to Siklós, because the position and the hard ground there made it more appropriate as a battleground. The Habsburg right wing moving westward began to march through a densely forested area. Sari Süleyman Paşa decided that this was just the chance he was waiting for. He ordered an attack with his entire army on the Imperial army's left wing, which under Maximilian II Emanuel, Elector of Bavaria was still in its earlier position, and which according to the Habsburg battle plan was also to start marching west. The Ottoman army caught the Imperial army near Nagyharsány and the nearby Nagyharsány Hill, with its heavily wooded steep slopes. Their cavalry, consisting of 8000 Sipahis, tried to outflank this Habsburg army wing from the left. The commander of the wing, the Elector of Bavaria, immediately sent a courier to the Duke of Lorraine, informing him that this wing was under threat. Orders were given and sent quickly and positions were taken immediately to resist the attack of the superior Ottoman forces, which had twice the number as the Imperial forces. The Habsburg infantry held their position, and Gen. Enea Silvio Piccolomini with some of his cavalry regiments successfully counterattacked and stopped the advance of the Ottoman Sipahi cavalry.

The Ottoman Grand Vizier was surprised by this unexpectedly fierce resistance and ordered the cessation of the Ottoman attack. The Ottoman artillery continued to shell the Habsburg positions, but the infantry and cavalry troops were ordered to hold their positions and  the infantry to go defensive behind the fortifications. This relative lull in fighting gave the right wing of the Habsburg army enough time to return to its original position. The Duke of Lorraine initially thought that his army should defend the positions, which might have led to a relative standstill. However, to gain the initiative, the Elector of Bavaria and the Margrave Louis of Baden-Baden persuaded him to order a large-scale counterattack. The deployment of the Habsburg army for this counterattack was finished at 3:00 pm. At that same time Sari Süleyman Paşa decided to attack again alongside Mustafa Pasha of Rodosto, the commander of the Janissary. Again, Sipahis supported the Janissary infantry frontal attack by attempting to outflank the Habsburg army. The Margrave of Baden-Baden successfully resisted the attack with his infantry squadrons and then went on to attack the still unfinished Ottoman defensive position. At the forefront of this Imperial penetrative attack on the Ottoman fortifications were troops under the command of the generals Rabutin and Eugene of Savoy. The Ottoman cavalry could not outflank them because the steep terrain was difficult for their horses; they had to dismount. The Ottoman attack and then resistance collapsed and Ottoman army retreated in a wild flight. The battle became a crushing defeat for the Ottomans.

Throughout the battle only the left wing of the Habsburg army saw the main action. There was a dense forest in front of the army's right wing that prevented it from attacking. Despite this, it attempted a bypassing maneuver on the right to force the relocation and withdrawal of the Ottomans, but its columns lost their way in the forest.

The losses of the Habsburg army were very light, about 600 men. The Ottoman army suffered huge losses, with an estimated 10,000 dead, as well as the loss of most of its artillery (about 66 guns) and much of its support equipment. The splendid command tent of the Grand Vizier and 160 Ottoman flags fell into Imperial hands. It is reported that the value of the share of the bounty that was given to the Elector of Bavaria surpassed two million golden ducats.

Aftermath
After the battle, the Ottoman Empire fell into deep crisis. There was a mutiny among the troops. Commander Sari Suleyman Pasa became frightened that he would be killed by his own troops and fled from his command, first to Belgrade and then to Constantinople. When the news of the defeat and the mutiny arrived in Constantinople in early September, Abaza Siyavuş Pasha was appointed as the commander and as the Grand Vizier. However, before he could take over his command, the whole Ottoman army had disintegrated and the Ottoman household troops (Janissaries and Sipahis) started to return to their base in Constantinople under their own lower-rank officers. Even the Grand Vizier's regent in Constantinople was frightened and hid. Sari Suleyman Pasa was executed. Sultan Mehmed IV appointed the commander of Bosphorus Straits Köprülü Fazıl Mustafa Pasha as the Grand Vizier's regent in Constantinople. He consulted with the leaders of the army that existed and other leading Ottoman statesmen. After these, on 8 November it was decided to depose Sultan Mehmed IV and to enthrone Suleiman II as the new Sultan.

The disintegration of the Ottoman army allowed Imperial Habsburg armies to conquer large areas. They took over Osijek, Petrovaradin, Sremski Karlovci, Ilok, Valpovo, Požega, Palota and Eger. Most of present-day Slavonia and Transylvania came under Imperial rule. On 9 December there was organised a Diet of Pressburg (today Bratislava, Slovakia), and Archduke Joseph was crowned as the first hereditary king of Hungary, and descendant Habsburg emperors were declared the anointed kings of Hungary. For a year the Ottoman Empire was paralysed, and Imperial Habsburg forces were poised to capture Belgrade and penetrate deep into the Balkans.

Notes

References
 
Dupuy, Ernest R. and Trevor N. Dupuy, The Harper Encyclopedia of Military History, 4th Ed., HarperCollins Publishers, 1993,  .
Laffin, John, Brassey's Dictionary of Battles, Barnes & Noble Inc., 1998  .
Lord Kinross, The Ottoman Centuries New York: Morrow Quill Paperbacks 1977 pp. 350–351 

Conflicts in 1687
1687 in the Habsburg monarchy
17th century in Austria
17th century in Hungary
1687 in the Ottoman Empire
Battles of the Great Turkish War
Battles involving the Ottoman Empire
Battles involving Austria
Battles involving Habsburg Croatia
17th-century military history of Croatia
Battles involving Serbia